JS Ōyodo (DE-231) is the third ship of the s. She was commissioned on 23 January 1991.

Construction and career
Ōyodo was laid down at Hitachi Zosen Corporation Osaka Shipyard on 8 March 1989 and launched on 19 December 1989. She was commissioned on 23 January 1991 and deployed to Sasebo.

On 24 March 1997, the 39th escort corps was renamed to the 26th escort corps due to the revision of the corps number.

On 14 January 1999, the oil tanker Yoshimaru collided with the central port side of the ship at 11:11 am while moored at the Kurashima quay, causing an incident that caused a break.

In response to the 2011 Great East Japan Earthquake off the Pacific coast of Yokosuka caused by Tōhoku Earthquake, Ōyodo departed urgently to dispatch a disaster. On 16 March 2011, the 16th Escort Corps was abolished and transferred to the 15th Escort Corps, and the fixed port became Ōminato and transferred to the same area. 

Departed on 21 September 2012 to participate in the Japan-Russia search and rescue joint training conducted in Vladivostok Port and the surrounding waters, entered Vladivostok Port on 23 September, and trained with the escort ship  on 26 September and returned to the port on 28 September.

Yu Son is a vessel designated by the United Nations Security Council North Korea Sanctions Committee as a target of asset freezing and port entry bans in March 2018. The supply ship  belonging to the 1st Maritime Supply Corps of the Maritime Self-Defense Force confirmed that it was there.

Gallery

Citations

External links

1989 ships
Abukuma-class destroyer escorts
Ships built by Hitachi Zosen Corporation